Chrabrany is a municipality in the Topoľčany District of the Nitra Region, Slovakia. In 2011 it had 763 inhabitants.
The village Chrabrany forms a core of municipality. It is situated on the right bank of the Nitra river, three kilometres south of Topolcany.

A settlement has existed on the area of the village since the Prehistoric era and later in the times of Great Moravia; however the first mention of the municipality in written texts dates from 1291. In this period the village was a part of county of Chrabor family, in 1687 of the Hungarian noble family Erdődy (also Erdödy, Erdődi).

Etymology

Chrabrany is derived from " chrabor, -a, -o, hist. chrabr, adj." meaning "courageous, brave, lionhearted“ (chrabrъ from chorbrь, Slovak: chrabrý, Slovenian: hraber, Serbian, Croatian: hrabar, Czech: chrabrý, Polish: chrobry, Ukrainian: chorobryj etc.);
The name probably referred to residents of the village, brave and fearless by defending their rights, property, land or their kind-hearted feudal lord. Original name: in 1291—Hrabor, Chrabor—1773, Chrabrany—1808. The residents probably served their lord as his guards.

Belanov kút
On the right bank of Nitra river is located a protected natural phenomenon Belanov kút, which spreads over cadastral units of municipalities Chrabrany, Čeladince and Kovarce on the total area of 2.27 ha. Belanov kút is a picturesque oxbow lake surrounded by different kinds of typical Slovak trees such as willows, poplars, acacias, maples, alder trees and shrubwood (elderberry, buckthorn, etc.) and provides shelter for many protected animals and hydrophilic plants.

See also
 List of municipalities and towns in Slovakia

References

Genealogical resources

The records for genealogical research are available at the state archive "Statny Archiv in Nitra, Slovakia"

 Roman Catholic church records (births/marriages/deaths): 1758-1895 (parish B)

External links
http://en.e-obce.sk/obec/chrabrany/chrabrany.html
Official homepage
Surnames of living people in Chrabrany

Villages and municipalities in Topoľčany District